Rhodium carbonyl chloride is an organorhodium compound with the formula Rh2Cl2(CO)4.  It is a red-brown volatile solid that is soluble in nonpolar organic solvents. It is a precursor to other rhodium carbonyl complexes, some of which are useful in homogeneous catalysis.

Structure
The molecule consists of two planar Rh(I) centers linked by two bridging chloride ligands and four CO ligands.   X-ray crystallography shows that the two Rh(I) centers are square planar with the dihedral angle of 53° between the two RhCl2 planes.  The metals are nonbonding.

Synthesis and reactions
First prepared by Walter Hieber, it is typically prepared by treating hydrated rhodium trichloride with flowing carbon monoxide, according to this idealized redox equation:
2 RhCl3(H2O)3  +  6 CO   →   Rh2Cl2(CO)4  +  2 COCl2  +  6 H2O.

The complex reacts with triphenylphosphine to give the bis(triphenylphosphine)rhodium carbonyl chloride:
Rh2Cl2(CO)4  +  4 PPh3   →   2 trans-RhCl(CO)(PPh3)2  +  2 CO
With chloride salts, the dichloride anion forms:
Rh2Cl2(CO)4  +  2 Cl−   →   2 cis-[RhCl2(CO)2]−

With acetylacetone, rhodium carbonyl chloride reacts to give dicarbonyl(acetylacetonato)rhodium(I).

The dimer reacts with a variety of Lewis bases (:B)  to form adducts  RhCl(CO)2:B.    Its reaction with tetrahydrothiophene and the corresponding enthalpy are:
1/2 Rh2Cl2(CO)4  + :S(CH2)4 → RhCl(CO)2:S(CH2)4         ΔH = -31.8 kJ mol−1
This enthalpy corresponds to the enthalpy change for a reaction forming one mole of the product, RhCl(CO)2:S(CH2)4, from the acid dimer.
The dissociation energy for rhodium(I) dicarbonyl chloride dimer, which is an energy contribution prior to reaction with the donor, 
Rh2Cl2(CO)4   → 2 RhCl(CO)2
has been determined by the ECW model to be 87.1 kJ mol−1

N-heterocyclic carbene (NHC) ligands react with rhodium carbonyl chloride to give monomeric cis-[RhCl(NHC)(CO)2] complexes.  The IR spectra of these complexes have been used to estimate the donor strength of NHCs.

References

Organorhodium compounds
Homogeneous catalysis
Dimers (chemistry)
Carbonyl complexes
Chloro complexes
Rhodium(I) compounds